The Town of Bedford was incorporated in 1979. It remained separate until it was incorporated with the  Cities of Halifax, Dartmouth and Halifax County into the Halifax Regional Municipality in 1996.

Mayors
Francene Cosman 1979 - 1982
Keith A. Roberts 1982 - 1988
Peter Christie 1988 - 1991
Peter J. Kelly 1991 - 1996

Bedford
Government in Halifax, Nova Scotia